Hazelhurst means earsh (arable land) overgrown with hazel, it may refer to:

People
Leighton Wilson Hazelhurst, Jr., American aviator
Ronnie Hazelhurst, British Composer

Places
in Australia
Hazelhurst Regional Gallery and Arts Centre in Gymea, New South Wales, Australia

in the United States
Hazelhurst, Illinois
Hazelhurst (Skaneateles, New York), listed on the National Register of Historic Places in Onondaga County
Hazelhurst, Wisconsin, a town
Hazelhurst (community), Wisconsin, an unincorporated community
Hazel Hurst, Pennsylvania, a village in McKean County

See also
Hazlehurst (disambiguation)